The swallow-tailed cotinga (Phibalura flavirostris) is a species of passerine bird in the family Cotingidae. It is the only member of the genus Phibalura.

The nominate subspecies (P. f. flavirostris) are found in the Atlantic forest in south-eastern Brazil, eastern Paraguay and Argentina (Misiones only). The subspecies P. f. boliviana, which only was rediscovered in 2000 (after 98 years without any records), is restricted to the vicinity of Apolo in Bolivia. Both populations are threatened by habitat loss.

The race P. f. boliviana is treated by BirdLife International and on the World Bird List Version 8.2 as a separate species, the palkachupa cotinga or the Bolivian swallow-tailed cotinga. However, the South American Classification Committee decided not to split the swallow-tailed cotinga in 2011, and a large molecular phylogenetic study of the family Cotingidae published in 2014 found only small differences between the DNA sequences of the two taxa and thus did not provide evidence to support the treatment of P. f. boliviana as a separate species.

References

External links 
Photo; Article tropicalbirding
Swallow-tailed Cotinga photo gallery VIREO

swallow-tailed cotinga
Birds of Brazil
Birds of the Atlantic Forest
swallow-tailed cotinga
Taxa named by Louis Jean Pierre Vieillot
Taxonomy articles created by Polbot